His Excellency, Ambassador Dr Musa Bin Jaafar Bin Hassan was a career diplomat and academic from the Sultanate of Oman. Dr. Hassan was one of the longest-serving diplomats to UNESCO as Ambassador, Permanent Delegate of Oman from 1984 to 2009. He was promoted to Adviser with Special Grade at the Permanent Delegation in 2009 and continued in this capacity until 2016. From 2016 until his retirement in 2018 he served at the Embassy of Oman in Paris. He was decorated with 1 UNESCO Gold Medal, 3 UNESCO Silver Medals as well as the honorary title of "Ambassador for Peace". Dr. Musa Bin Jaafar Bin Hassan died in Paris, France on 26 September 2020.

Early life and education

Born in 1950, His Excellency came from the family of one of the biggest merchants in the commercial centre of Oman, Mutrah. As a young man, he studied Geography at Beirut University in Lebanon, before returning to Oman in 1976.

His talents were soon recognised as he was appointed the Director of the Department of Cultural Relations at the Ministry of Education. In the same year, he was named for the second time as President of the Al-Alhy Club and in 1983 was elected as the first Secretary-General of the University Club in Muscat, which later became known as the 'Cultural Club'.

Diplomatic work

In 1982, His Excellency's position at the Ministry of Education was extended to Director General of Missions and External Relations. In this capacity, he attended the conferences of UNESCO, the Office of International Education, and The Arab Organisation for Education, Culture, and Science. In 1984, He was appointed as Ambassador, Permanent Delegate of the Sultanate of Oman to UNESCO, in Paris, France and went on to develop an esteemed diplomatic career.

Dr Hassan's work as a permanent delegate of Oman from 1984 to 2009, during which time he served as President of the General Conference, culminated in a UNESCO gold medal and three UNESCO silver medals.

In 2009, Dr Hassan was promoted by Royal Decree to the position of Adviser with Special Grade as the Permanent Delegate of Oman to UNESCO from 2009 to 2016. From 2016 until his retirement at the end of 2018, he continued his diplomatic work as Adviser with Special Grade at the Embassy of the Sultanate of Oman in Paris.

Awards and accolades

Dr Hassan's diplomatic career was recognised with multiple awards and accolades, in addition to the UNESCO gold and silver medals. In 2007 he was awarded the title of 'Ambassador for peace' by the International Federation for World Peace and the International Federation of Religions for Peace. He also held the Order of Cultural Merit in the Arts and Literature of the rank of commander of the French Republic, and the Presidential Medal of Honor from the Republic of Bulgaria, both awarded in 2008.

In January 2016, he received the great honour of being conferred the Oman Civil Order, Third Class, by His Majesty Sultan Qaboos Bin Said. The prestigious title was awarded in recognition of his excellency's admirable work in carrying out his national duty.

Other works

Dr Hassan also pursued various interests outside of diplomacy, he worked with the Arab League’s Educational, Cultural and Scientific Organization (ALECSO) as a member of Oman’s delegation to the general conferences of ALECSO, and as Member of the Organization’s Executive Board (1976-1981). He also founded Oman-based business development consultancy Al-Ghafa in 1983, where he later took on an executive board position, as his son Salem Moosa Jaffar Hassan became managing director.

Dr Hassan was also Professor Lecturer on North Africa and the Middle East at the American Graduate School of International Relations and Diplomacy (Paris) and published a number of scholarly and literary works: "The Development of Omani Administrative Law", "Audat Shanjoub" (The Return of Shanjoub), "Wain Zamanak Ya Bahr" (The Lost Glory of Seafaring Days), "Min al Hayat" (From the Life), "Kalam al Nas Youji al Ras" (Gossip Source of Headache), "Al Darawish Sketches". Dr Hassan who had also been an actor and theatre director has penned several plays on social and cultural subjects.

Efforts for rights

Dr Hassan was elected president of the 33rd session of the General Conference, UNESCO's supreme governing body, in October 2005 with the unanimous support of the Arab-Group and other electoral groups, the executive board, and served until the end of his mandate in November 2007. During his presidency, he worked tirelessly with the two other organs of UNESCO (the executive board, the secretariat) to oversee the implementation of the resolutions and decisions that different ministers of education had decided on during the deliberations of the 33rd session of the General Conference.

A strong defender of women's rights; one of his most famous quotes which gave him a standing ovation at the opening of the 34th session of the General Conference: "May you be blessed, O women: mother, lover, sister, wife and friend, because you are my life."

He also strongly advocated the right to education. In his speeches, he went on record condemning the extravagant budgets on cigarette advertisements while education remained the most under-funded social right. He was among the first to go on record to say that educating every single child who has not received primary education would cost a total of 6 billion dollars.

Comments about him

During the 34th Session of the General Conference, Mr Koïchiro Matsuura, the Director-General of UNESCO said the following on his 2-year term as President:

"...During this time you have been present on all fronts of UNESCO - if you will permit me to use this metaphor. You have been one of our best ambassadors to the world, and you have graced the messages of the Organization with your rich culture and wisdom..."

The chairman of the executive board, Mr Zhang Xinsheng, said regarding Hassan's term:

"Your mandate as President of the General Conference may come to an end, but the echo of your contribution to our Organization will continue to resound in this House."

Salem Moosa Jaffar Hassan, on his father's death:

"His impressive career doesn't even come close to how we will remember him; as a wonderful father. husband, brother and son. Everything he did was out of love for his family."

References 

Permanent Delegates of Oman to UNESCO
Living people
Omani activists
Year of birth missing (living people)